Huddersfield Town's 1913–14 campaign was a particularly disappointing season following 5th place the previous season. Town would finish 13th, 15 points off Bradford (Park Avenue), who finished 2nd place.

Squad at the start of the season

Review
After finishing 5th place in their 3rd season in the Football League, Town didn't live up to the standards set the previous season, with the only standout result being the 7-0 win over Birmingham in October. They finished in 13th place with only 34 points.

Squad at the end of the season

Results

Division Two

FA Cup

Appearances and goals

1913-14
English football clubs 1913–14 season